Tales of the Kingdom Trilogy includes three allegorical books: Tales of the Kingdom (1983), Tales of the Resistance (1986) and Tales of the Restoration (1996), by authors David and Karen Mains. The series has been the recipient of the Evangelical Christian Publishers Association (ECPA) Gold Medallion Award  under the Children's Book Category.

Plot 
Book 1 - Tales of the Kingdom

The story revolves around Scarboy who is followed by action, intrigue, and danger wherever he goes. This misfortune especially occurs in the Enchanted City, where the “imperfect” are cast away and orphans are enslaved. Scarboy manages to escape the evil Enchanter to safety in Great Park, but has yet to confront his greatest fear—and he will need enormous courage to conquer it!

Book 2 - Tales of the Resistance

This second book of the trilogy contains 12 stories about Hero's participation in the underground taxi resistance against the evil Enchanter, challenger to the one True King. Other characters include Carny, Doubletalk, Sewer Rat #1, the Boiler Brat and the Most Beautiful Player of All.

Book 3 - Tales of the Restoration

In Tales of the Restoration, the conclusion to the Kingdom Tales trilogy, the restoration has begun. Between power-outs, mudslinging, and peril at Burning Place, our heroes look to celebrate life under the King's reign, and enjoy the Great Celebration.

Reception 
The books have received mostly favourable reviews from several readers  and authors. Harold Myra of Gordon College found them to have "sound theology wrapped in creative storytelling", and to be "substantive and biblical, skillfully crafted, marvelous for family reading". A campaign to revise the content, fully re-illustrate all the art, and republish a 30th-anniversary collectible edition of these storybooks in digital, print, and audio formats was launched through Kickstarter.

Gallery

References

External links
 Kingdom Tales Trilogy  
 Kingdom Tales on Amazon

Christian allegory
Christian children's books
American children's books
Series of children's books
Children's short story collections
Literary trilogies
Children's poetry books
Children's books
Children's fiction books
Fantasy books by series